Ignatius Malgraff (born 17 February 1993 in East London, South Africa) is a South African field hockey player.

Malgraff represented South Africa in the 2014 Commonwealth Games in Glasgow

Honours

Club
2016 PHL Men - Player of the Tournament

References

External links

Living people
1993 births
Sportspeople from East London, Eastern Cape
South African male field hockey players
Field hockey players at the 2014 Commonwealth Games
Commonwealth Games competitors for South Africa
2014 Men's Hockey World Cup players